Friockheim  is a village in Angus, Scotland dating from 1814. It lies between the towns of Arbroath, Brechin, Forfar and Montrose.

History
The name 'Friockheim', literally translated, means 'Heather Home', with Friock being a derivative from the Gaelic 'fraoch' (heather) and 'heim' from the German for home. The word 'Friockheim' as a whole, is pronounced 'Free-come'.

The birth of the village took place soon after 1814 when Thomas Gardyne of Middleton succeeded his brother as the laird of the lands of Friock and feued them to Mr John Andson, of Arbroath, who built a flax spinning mill and as proprietor-in-feu attracted many textile workers to come and settle on easy terms in what was at first known as Friock feus.

Mr Andson's son, John Andson added in the 'heim' part of the name. This was at the request of the numerous Flemish weavers who had gone there to develop the flax spinning process. He had to obtain the sanction of Thomas Gardyne as superior and together they agreed on the following advertisement, which is thought of as Friockheim's foundation charter.

Printed in Arbroath and dated May 22, 1824 this read:
"The Spinning Mill and Village of Friock, of which Mr Gardyne of Middleton is the Superior, and Mr John Andson, Proprietor holding in feu, hitherto called 'Friock Feus' from this date henceforward is to be named “FRIOCKHEIM” and of which change of designation this on the part of Mr Gardyne and Mr Andson is notice unto all whom it may concern.”

John Andson died in office in 1814 (?) and his mill was burnt to the ground in 1862.

Recent changes
The village of Friockheim now has a population of around 800  - lower than its peak of 1,200 in the early 1900s.  It has a convenience store and pharmacy as well as several small businesses and shops. There is also a public park and two village halls as well as a primary school and community centre.  It also has its own church, dating from 1835.

Friockheim was served by a railway station on the Arbroath and Forfar Railway from 1848 to 1955. The line has since been lifted.

It used to be home to Douglas Fraser & Sons (Mfg) Ltd producing waterproof and leisure clothing but this firm no longer exists, and the ground where its mill was situated is now the site of modern housing.  Planning conditions require the reinstatement of the mill lade, or at least part of it, with public access.

The local newsagent closed in 2016 after several decades of service to the village. The local co-operative has converted to a McColls, which provides many of the services the village has become accustomed to.

S.G. Baker Ltd  produces hessian, cotton and polypropylene sacks for agriculture and business packaging.  Although still based in the village, this firm is less involved in manufacturing than it used to be, and more involved in distributing goods that are manufactured overseas. It also has a base in Forfar.

Friockheim now has a 'By Royal Appointment' sign, for Mike Lingard, Gunsmith, who supplied guns to Prince Charles. Mr Lingard's premises are in the former Clydesdale Bank building in Gardyne Street.

Park Grove Crematorium opened in the 1990s and is used by surrounding towns as well as Friockheim itself as it is currently the only one in Angus.

Film of the village was shot in the 1930s by Dr AGW Thomson and is held by the Cinema Museum in London (ref HMo163).Cinema Museum Home Movie Database.xlsx

Nearby Parishes 
Guthrie, Kinnell, Kirkden (previously Idvies, now disappeared).

References

External links 

Details with photo

Villages in Angus, Scotland
World War II prisoner of war camps in Scotland